In enzymology, a 1,5-anhydro-D-fructose reductase (1,5-anhydro-D-mannitol-forming) is an enzyme that catalyzes the chemical reaction

1,5-anhydro-D-mannitol + NADP  1,5-anhydro-D-fructose + NADPH + H

Thus, the two substrates of this enzyme are 1,5-anhydro-D-mannitol and NADP, whereas its 3 products are 1,5-anhydro-D-fructose, NADPH, and H.

This enzyme belongs to the common family of oxidoreductases, specifically those acting on the CH-OH group of donor with NAD or NADP as acceptor. The systematic name of this enzyme class is 1,5-anhydro-D-mannitol:NADP oxidoreductase. Other names in common use include 1,5-anhydro-D-fructose reductase (ambiguous), and AFR.

References

 
 

EC 1.1.1
NADPH-dependent enzymes
Enzymes of unknown structure